Lifestyles of the Rich & Shameless" is the second single released from the Lost Boyz's debut album, Legal Drug Money. Easy Mo Bee produced the original version of the song, while Mr. Sexxx and Reese "Dat Nigga" Johnson each contributed their own remix to the song.

Released In early '95,"Lifestyles of the Rich & Shameless" became a minor hit on the Billboard Hot 100, reaching number 91, while becoming a fairly sizable hit on the Billboard Hot Rap Singles, where it peaked at number 10.

Single track listing

A-Side
"Lifestyles of the Rich & Shameless" (LP Version)—4:23
"Lifestyles of the Rich & Shameless" (Mr. Sex Mix)—4:04

B-Side
"Lifestyles of the Rich & Shameless" (Dat Nigga Mix)—4:34
"Jeeps, Lex Coups, Bimaz & Benz" (LP Version)—4:27

Chart history

1996 singles
1996 songs
Lost Boyz songs
Song recordings produced by Easy Mo Bee
Songs written by Denzil Foster
Songs written by Thomas McElroy
Songs written by Mr. Cheeks